Edray is an unincorporated community in Pocahontas County, West Virginia, United States. It is home to the Edray State Trout Hatchery.

The community derives its name from the ancient city of Edrei.

References

Unincorporated communities in Pocahontas County, West Virginia
Unincorporated communities in West Virginia